Jean Christophe Iseux, Baron von Pfetten zu St. Mariakirchen (born 11 November 1967 in Lyon), is a diplomat, academic and landowner.

Pfetten is the chairman of the Institute for East West Strategic Studies and a bye-fellow of Emmanuel College, Cambridge University.

Pfetten served as specially invited member of the upper house of the Chinese parliament between 2001 and 2012, the first European ever to hold such position in China.

Pfetten hosted a series of private meetings on Iran's nuclear programme attended by top military commanders from Iran and Israel as well as senior officials from the P5 nations which strongly contributed to the success of the Nuclear Interim Deal achieved in Geneva on 11 November 2013.

Early life and education
Pfetten received his BSc and MSc (Physics and Chemistry) from the University of Strasbourg, and, his Dipl. Eng. Geophysicist from the Institut de Physique du Globe (admissible to the Ecole Normale Supérieure) and thereafter won a European Erasmus scholarship. In 1989 he patented two inventions in the fields of nuclear submarine and of hydraulic fracturing which he presented at the SPE (Society of Petroleum Engineers) Production Operations Symposium on April 7–9, 1991 in Oklahoma, USA. He has also a master's degree in management studies from Templeton College, Oxford University, graduating in 1991. In the same time he read for an MPhil in international relations at Trinity Hall, Cambridge University, and, in 1992 read for a master's degree in political science at Bonn University in Germany.

Diplomacy
Pfetten was Chargé de Mission at the French embassy in Bonn, Germany, from 1991 to 1992. Aged 28 he became the youngest ambassador to the United Nations in Geneva as Permanent Representative to the World Trade Organization and the United Nations Conference on Disarmament between 1996 and 1997.

Pfetten hosted a breakthrough three days meeting at his French chateau in 2011 bringing a ministerial delegation from the Vatican together with senior Chinese officials for the first time since WWII which kickstarted diplomatic negotiations leading to the 2019 MOU signature between the two nations, the Financial Times reported.

On 11 July 2018 Pfetten was invited to give evidence on foreign policy in a shifting world order to the UK House of Lords Select Committee on International Relations.

Academic career
Pfetten is currently the chairman of the Institute for East West Strategic Studies and is a visiting professor at People's University of China (since 2006). He is also a bye-fellow of Emmanuel College, Cambridge University (since November 2015). Previously Pfetten was a research associate at the Oxford Centre for Management Studies, Oxford University, from 1992 to 1994 and served as vice-president of the think-tank Oxford Analytica from 1994 to 1996. He then worked as a visiting scholar, teaching leadership management at the International MBA program of Tsinghua University from 1999 to 2000 and became Professor of International Political Economics at the School of Economics of Renmin University starting in September 2000 for a six-year tenure. At the same time, he was Director of China Studies at the Regulatory Policy Institute, which used to be called the Regulatory Policy Research Center affiliated with Hertford College, Oxford University, from 1998 to 2005. He was also a member of the Advisory Board of the Ecole des Hautes Etudes Commerciales in Paris, Honorary Professor at the Assumption University of Thailand, Member of the Beijing Academy of Social Sciences, Research Fellow of the China National School of Administration, and, China Advisor to the Asian Strategic and Leadership Institute.

China
Pfetten was a specially invited member of the People's Political Consultative Conference (CPPCC) as representative for Changchun 2001–2005 and member of the Foreign Affairs Committee of CPPCC Shanghai 2009–2012. He was Special Advisor on Foreign Economic and Trade Cooperation to the Central Government (CEEC) from 2005 to 2009. He was investment advisor to 34 local governments in China including Beijing, Shanghai, Tianjin, Chongqing, Nanjing, Qingdao, and Shenzhen. He was also an adviser to the Investment Research Institute of the National Development and Reform Commission, the MOFCOM Transnational Institute, the All-China Chamber of Commerce, the Society of Environmental Sciences of the Ministry of Environmental Protection and the Chinese National Economic Research Institute.

Until recently Pfetten was China Advisor to the US Coalition of Service Industries and Honorary Representative of the Vancouver Board of Trade.

Pfetten currently holds non-executive positions on the boards of several multinationals.
Pfetten has been credited with attracting around 2% of total foreign direct investment into China since 2002.

Iran nuclear meetings
The Financial Times, Newsweek  and The Spectator  reported that between June and October 2013 Pfetten organized two rounds of back-channel diplomatic meetings on the issue of Iran's nuclear program. The first round, hosted by the Institute for East West Strategic Studies and held at Green Templeton College, Oxford, brought together senior Chinese and Israeli officials. A second, more confidential round of talks, hosted by Pfetten in his French chateau, was moderated by former Australian Prime Minister Bob Hawke and French Defence Minister Michele Alliot-Marie. Attendees included Major General Huang Baifu, vice chairman of the China Institute for International Strategic Studies; a former chief of general staff of the Iranian Air Force; as well as General Doron Avital, chairman of the Israeli Knesset's Security and Defense Committee. Pfetten told The Financial Times that the "Track II" meeting was "aimed at persuading Beijing to take a more pro-active involvement in the Middle East"  and emphasized 'the willingness of China and the US to work hand-in-hand in resolving the Iranian nuclear issue.'

Awards and family
Prof. von Pfetten was named a Global Leader of Tomorrow by the World Economic Forum in 2003.
Pfetten received the Chinese government's Confucius Medal in 1998 and the Lei Feng Award for Merit in 1999 for his humanitarian work following the 1997 earthquake and 1998 flood in China (he is the first and only foreigner ever to receive this award).

On 8 August 2009, Pfetten got married and now has two children: Charlotte and Maximilian.

Pfetten was elected member of the very selective XVIIIth century conservative Beefsteak Club in 2015.

Hound breeding
Pfetten was a joint master of the New Forest Foxhounds in Hampshire after Oxford and Junior master of the Equipage de Vens et Venaille for ten seasons from 1990 to 2000. One of Pfetten's English foxhounds, Colonel, was named "Meilleur de Race" (Best of Breed) at the French National Hound Show (Fontainebleau June 2011). He was made a Champion at the World Dog Show (Paris July 2011) and became Champion of Champions at Bruxelles final show in October 2011, the first ever foxhound to win the title. Pfetten was elected president of the International Foxhound Association in 2012.

Pfetten is member of the UK based Master of Foxhound Association (MFHA) since 1992 and his French pack of fox-hounds is overseas member of the British Hound Sport Association (BHSA) since 2022.

Apethorpe Palace
In December 2014, English Heritage announced that Baron Pfetten had bought Apethorpe Palace, a Jacobean stately home near Oundle in Northamptonshire.

Simon Thurley, English Heritage's chief executive, welcomed the purchase, saying, "Since 2000 English Heritage has consistently said that the best solution for Apethorpe is for it to be taken on by a single owner, who wants to continue to restore the house and to live in it; especially one who has experience of restoring historic buildings and is prepared to share its joys with a wide public, as Baron Pfetten will do. Apethorpe is certainly on a par with Hatfield and Knole and is by far the most important country house to have been threatened with major loss through decay since the 1950s." Baron Pfetten has agreed to an 80-year commitment of 50 days' public opening a year, a far more extensive undertaking than usual.

Apethorpe Palace was a favourite residence of King James I and is now undergoing major renovation works solely funded by Baron Pfetten since 2014.

Pfetten is member of the Historic Houses Association since 2015.

References

Living people
French diplomats
University of Strasbourg alumni
1967 births
Alumni of Templeton College, Oxford
French expatriates in China
Permanent Representatives to the World Trade Organization
Academic staff of Renmin University of China